Steffi Graf was the defending champion but did not compete that year.

Gabriela Sabatini won in the final 6–1, 6–7, 6–1 against Helen Kelesi.

Seeds
A champion seed is indicated in bold text while text in italics indicates the round in which that seed was eliminated. The top eight seeds received a bye to the second round.

  Chris Evert (third round)
  Gabriela Sabatini (champion)
  Claudia Kohde-Kilsch (third round)
  Katerina Maleeva (second round)
  Raffaella Reggi (quarterfinals)
  Sandra Cecchini (quarterfinals)
  Sylvia Hanika (quarterfinals)
  Arantxa Sánchez (semifinals)
  Nathalie Tauziat (first round)
  Isabel Cueto (third round)
  Jana Novotná (first round)
  Kathleen Horvath (first round)
  Judith Wiesner (semifinals)
  Helen Kelesi (final)
 n/a
 n/a

Draw

Finals

Top half

Section 1

Section 2

Bottom half

Section 3

Section 4

References

External links
 1988 Italian Open draw

1988 WTA Tour
Women's Singles
1988 in Italian women's sport